Malacolimax is a genus of air-breathing land slugs, terrestrial pulmonate gastropod mollusks in the family Limacidae, the keelback slugs.

Species
Species within the genus Malacolimax include:
 Malacolimax mrazeki (Simroth, 1904)
 Malacolimax tenellus O. F. Müller, 1774, the type species
 Malacolimax wiktori Alonso & Ibáñez, 1989

References

Limacidae
Taxonomy articles created by Polbot